Rehoboth may refer to:

Rehoboth (Bible), the name of three Biblical places

Places

Namibia
Rehoboth, Namibia
Rehoboth Ratepayers' Association
Rehoboth (homeland), a Baster territory in South West Africa (present-day Namibia)

United States

Rehoboth Beach, Delaware
 Rehoboth, DeKalb County, Georgia
 Rehoboth, Harris County, Georgia
Rehoboth (Eldorado, Maryland), listed on the National Register of Historic Places in Dorchester County, Maryland
Rehoboth, Massachusetts
Rehoboth, New Mexico
Rehoboth (Chappaqua, New York), listed on the National Register of Historic Places in Westchester County, New York
Rehoboth, Perry County, Ohio
Rehoboth, Seneca County, Ohio

Other places
Rehoboth Christian College, Perth, Western Australia
Rehoboth, the conventional English name for Rehovot, Israel
Rehoboth Specialist Hospital, Nigeria

Other uses
145475 Rehoboth, an asteroid
Rehoboth Bay, Delaware, United States
Rehoboth Christian School, Rehoboth, New Mexico, United States
USS Rehoboth, the name of more than one United States Navy ship

See also 
Rehobeth (disambiguation)
Rehoboth Carpenter family